Cosmo is a British/Italian surname and unisex given name. It means order, decency, and beauty; this is the English form of Cosimo, introduced to Britain in the 18th century by the Scottish nobleman the second Duke of Gordon, who named his son and successor after his friend Cosimo III de' Medici. Notable people and fictional characters with the name include:

Given name
 Cosmo and Damian, 3rd-century Christian martyrs
 Cosmo de Medici, alternate name of Cosimo de' Medici (1389–1464)
 Cosmo I, alternate name of Cosimo I de' Medici, Grand Duke of Tuscany (1519–1574)
 Cosmo Alexander (1724–1772), Scottish portrait painter
 Cosmo Allegretti, actor and puppeteer in the 1955–1984 children's television series Captain Kangaroo
 Cosmo Baker (b. 1974), American disc jockey
 Sir Cosmo Bonsor, 1st Baronet (1848–1929), British MP, chairman of the South Eastern Railway
 Cosmo Campoli (1923–1997), American sculptor
 Cosmo A. Cilano (1893–1937), New York state senator
 Cosmo P. DeStefano (b. 1962), American author
 Sir Cosmo Duff-Gordon, 5th Baronet (1862–1931), British landowner, survivor of the RMS Titanic
 Cosmo Gordon, 3rd Duke of Gordon (1720–1752), Scottish nobleman
 Cosmo Gordon Lang (1864–1945), Archbishop of Canterbury 
 Cosmo Graham, British professor
 Cosmo Hamilton (1870–1942), British playwright
 Cosmo Iacavazzi (b. 1943), American football player
 Cosmo Innes (1798–1874), British antiquarian
 Cosmo Jarvis (b. 1989), American-born English actor and musician
 Cosmo Klein (b. 1978), German singer
 Cosmo Landesman (b. 1954), American-born British journalist
 Cosmo Maciocia (b. 1942), Canadian politician
 Cosmo Parkinson (1884–1967), British civil servant
 Cosmo Wilson (b. 1961), American concert lighting designer and director for rock bands

Surname
 Anthony Cosmo (disambiguation)
 Fran Cosmo (b. 1956), American musician, former lead singer of the band Boston
 James Cosmo (b. 1948), British actor
 Julián Di Cosmo (b. 1984), Italian-Argentine football player
 Nicholas Cosmo (b. 1971), Italian-American fund manager accused of $400 million Ponzi scheme
 Mariel Everton Cosmo Da Silva (b. 1980), Brazilian football player known as "Tozo"
 Roberto Di Cosmo, Italian computer scientist

Fictional characters
 Cosmo Julius Cosma, in the animated series The Fairly OddParents, Timmy and Chloe's godfather and Wanda's husband
 Cosmo, in the anime Sonic X
 Cosmo of Prague, a character in a story within the novel Phantastes by George MacDonald
 Cosmo the Merry Martian, title character of a 1950s comic book
 Cosmo the Spacedog, a fictional psychic Russian dog appearing in Marvel Comics
 Private Cosmo, from the comic strip Beetle Bailey
 Cosmo Brown, in the 1952 film Singin' in the Rain and its subsequent stage musical adaptation
 Cosmo Carboni a con man played by Sylvester Stallone in the 1978 film Paradise Alley
 Imai Cosmo, in the Kengan Ashura manga series
 Jason Cosmo, protagonist of several novels by Dan McGirt
 Cosmo Hill, from the novel The Supernaturalist by Eoin Colfer
 Cosmo Jones, Crime Smasher, protagonist in the 1943 American film starring Frank Graham
 Cosmo Kramer, played by Michael Richards in the NBC television sitcom Seinfeld
 Cosmo Martin, son of Susan Lewis and Chuck Martin in the medical drama ER
 Cosmo Renfro, from The Fugitive (1993 film) and U.S. Marshals (1998 film)
 Cosmo Royale, in the Power Rangers Ninja Steel
 Professor Cosmo Saltana, from the 1968 novel The Image Men by J. B. Priestley
 Mr. Cosmo Spacely, George Jetson's boss in the 1960s cartoon The Jetsons
 Cosmo Topper, from the Topper series of novels by James Thorne Smith Jr., several films, and the 1950s CBS sitcom Topper

Masculine given names
English masculine given names
Italian masculine given names
Surnames
Surnames of British Isles origin
Surnames of Italian origin